María Sornosa Martínez (born 15 June 1949 in Manises, Valencia) is a Spanish politician and Member of the European Parliament with the Spanish Socialist Workers' Party (PSOE), part of the Socialist Group. She sits on the European Parliament's Committee on the Environment, Public Health and Food Safety.

Sornosa Martinez is a substitute for the Committee on Employment and Social Affairs, a member of the Delegation to the ACP-European Union Joint Parliamentary Assembly and a substitute for the Delegation for relations with the countries of Central America.

Education
 1991: Graduate in geography and history, University of Valencia.
 1992: Environment and regional planning adviser to the Valencian regional government.
 1994: Diploma in neurolinguistic programming.

Career
 1979-1994: Member of the Manises Municipal Council, with responsibility for health.
 since 1994: Member of the European Parliament.
She is the author of the book Viajes, memoria parlamentaria.

See also
2004 European Parliament election in Spain

External links
 
 

1949 births
Living people
People from Horta Oest
Politicians from the Valencian Community
Spanish Socialist Workers' Party MEPs
MEPs for Spain 1999–2004
MEPs for Spain 2004–2009
MEPs for Spain 1994–1999
20th-century women MEPs for Spain
21st-century women MEPs for Spain